Elections to Rochford Council were held on 10 June 2004. One third of the council was up for election and the Conservative party stayed in overall control of the council.

After the election, the composition of the council was:

Election result

3 Conservative candidates were unopposed.

Ward results

Ashingdon and Canewdon

Foulness and Great Wakering

Hockley Central

Hockley North

Hockley West

Hullbridge

Lodge

Rayleigh Central

Rochford

Sweyne Park

Trinity

Wheatley

Whitehouse

References
2004 Rochford election result
Rochford: Triumphant Tories
Ward results 

2004
2004 English local elections
2000s in Essex